Envision Financial, a division of First West Credit Union, is based in British Columbia, Canada. Founded in 1946, Envision Financial was established in 2001 through a merger between Lower Mainland-based Delta Credit Union, whose roots were in the fishing industry, and Fraser Valley-based First Heritage Savings Credit Union, which had historic ties to the farming and agriculture industries. First Heritage Savings Credit Union was the product of a merger between East Chilliwack Credit Union and Clearbrook District Mennonite Savings Credit Union in 1983. It is insured by the Credit Union Deposit Insurance Corporation of British Columbia.

In 2008, Envision Financial entered into discussions with Penticton-based Valley First Credit Union to merge with one another and develop a new financial services organization for Western Canada. In September 2009, members at both credit unions voted in favour of the merger proposal, and on Jan. 1, 2010, Envision Financial and Valley First merged to become First West Credit Union. In 2013, Enderby & District Credit Union joined First West Credit Union, followed by Island Savings Credit Union in 2015.

First West Credit Union has $14 billion in total assets and assets under management, approximately 1,250 employees and more than 250,000 members. The credit union is the third largest in B.C. and the fifth largest in Canada. Its divisions—Envision Financial, Valley First, Island Savings and Enderby & District Financial—operate under their existing brand names in their respective markets.

About Envision Financial
Envision Financial has a network of 19 branches throughout B.C. in the communities of Abbotsford, Chilliwack, Delta, Hope, Kitimat, Langley, Mission, Surrey and Maple Ridge. Its regional administration centre is located in Langley.

For eight consecutive years, Envision Financial was recognized as one of the 50 Best Employers in Canada by The Globe and Mails Report on Business magazine, which publishes the annual 50 Best Employers in Canada survey conducted by Hewitt Associates. In 2007, Envision Financial received the inaugural "Employer of Choice" WorkLife BC Award sponsored by the British Columbia provincial government's Ministry of Children and Family Development. Envision Financial is also designated a Caring Company by Imagine Canada.

External links
Envision Financial official site
Humanomics

References

First West Credit Union
Banks established in 2001
Canadian companies established in 2001
2001 establishments in British Columbia